R v Shein is an important case in South African law, heard in the Appellate Division, Bloemfontein, on 15 September 1924, with judgment handed down on 3 October. Innes CJ, Solomon JA, De Villiers JA, Kotz JA and Wessels JA presided. The court found that the evidence on which a jury is entitled to convict upon a criminal charge is evidence on which reasonable men could properly convict. If the evidence produced cannot be so described, the court will set aside the verdict not as deciding the facts itself, but because the jury has not, in its opinion, duly discharged the judicial duty cast upon it. If, on the other hand, the evidence does answer to that description, the court will refuse to interfere, not because it would have come to the same conclusion itself, but because no ground exists for interference with the discharge of a duty entrusted by law to the jury alone.

Facts 
A jury had convicted the accused on a charge of arson.

Judgment 
The court found that there was evidence before the jury on which reasonable men could properly have convicted, and therefore refused to interfere with the verdict. A person who sets fire to the house of another must be taken to have contemplated and intended injury to the owner of the house, whether such owner is insured or not. The court followed the judgment in R v Kewelram.

See also 
 Appeal
 Conviction
 Crime in South Africa
 Intention (criminal law)
 Jury
 Law of South Africa
 Reasonable person
 South African criminal law

References

Case law 
 R v Kewelram 1922 AD 213.
 R v Shein 1925 AD 6.

Notes 

Appellate Division (South Africa) cases
1924 in South African law
1924 in case law
Arson in Africa
Juries